Suquamish is a census-designated place (CDP) in Kitsap County, Washington, United States. The population was 4,140 at the 2010 census. Comprising the Port Madison Indian Reservation, it is the burial site of Chief Seattle and the site of the Suquamish tribe winter longhouse known as Old Man House.

Geography
Suquamish is located in northern Kitsap County at  (47.730901, -122.564456), across Agate Passage from Bainbridge Island. The village of Suquamish is in the northeast part of the CDP, and Washington State Route 305 crosses the southern part, leading southeast across the Agate Pass Bridge to Bainbridge Island and west  to Poulsbo.

Demographics
As of the census of 2000, there were 3,510 people, 1,459 households, and 948 families residing in the CDP. The population density was 513.1 people per square mile (198.1/km2). There were 1,580 housing units at an average density of 231.0/sq mi (89.2/km2). The racial makeup of the CDP was 81.3% White, 0.3% African American, 9.6% Native American, 2.4% Asian, 0.2% Pacific Islander, 1.3% from other races, and 4.8% from two or more races. Hispanic or Latino of any race were 3.1% of the population.

There were 1,459 households, out of which 30.2% had children under the age of 18 living with them, 52.0% were married couples living together, 8.6% had a female householder with no husband present, and 35.0% were non-families. 28.0% of all households were made up of individuals, and 9.3% had someone living alone who was 65 years of age or older. The average household size was 2.40 and the average family size was 2.92.

In the CDP, the population was spread out, with 24.2% under the age of 18, 6.4% from 18 to 24, 29.3% from 25 to 44, 27.2% from 45 to 64, and 12.9% who were 65 years of age or older. The median age was 40 years. For every 100 females, there were 97.2 males. For every 100 females age 18 and over, there were 93.5 males.

The median income for a household in the CDP was $46,667, and the median income for a family was $55,759. Males had a median income of $41,860 versus $27,296 for females. The per capita income for the CDP was $22,515. About 6.2% of families and 8.5% of the population were below the poverty line, including 8.1% of those under age 18 and 10.8% of those age 65 or over.

Education
Chief Kitsap Academy is in Suquamish.

Northwest College of Art & Design was formerly in Suquamish. In 1991 the institution, then the Northwest College of Art, began leasing the former Mains Manor, and in 2000 Craig Freeman, the founder of the school, bought the property. The Squamish tribe had purchased the former college building for $5.03 million on November 28, 2017 and made it into the current Chief Kitsap Building.

See also
 Old Man House

References

External links
 
 Kitsap Peninsula Visitor Information - Suquamish

Census-designated places in Kitsap County, Washington
Census-designated places in Washington (state)